Udgam School for Children is private running school located at Thaltej, Ahmedabad, Gujarat, India. It is a senior secondary school affiliated to the Central Board of Secondary Education (CBSE), New Delhi.

History 
Udgam School for Children was founded in 1965 by Sarojben Carvalho with a few students. During 1991 the Kantilal Jaikishandas Charitable Trust  took a lead and moved the campus to larger space.

Notable activities

Kerala flood donation 
In 2018, teachers of Udgam School donated their one-day salary  for Kerala Flood victims, which is sum of nearly Rs 6.5 lakhs. Also, students of the school raised nearly 3.5 Lakhs  for the flood victim

Female school bus driver 
The school has appointed Shabana Shaikh, Rekha Kahar as a female driver for the school buses.

Sanitary napkin vending machines for students 
The school had deployed the sanitary pad vending machines in the girls washrooms at the school. Students can insert coin of INR 5 and get a single sanitary napkin.

KBD Junior Pro League Champion 
Total 24 team were part of this tournament and out all team from Udgam School won the trophy by beating Vedanta School

World’s Youngest Computer Programmer 
Arham Om Talsania, a student of Class 2 for the school, sets new Guinness record as Youngest Computer Programmer.

Controversies 

 On 5 April 2022, around 500 students had to wait out side the school due to school bus mismanagement. The parents were not allowed to visit the school office to discuss the same issue. The parents were allowed in only after police intervened. After this incident District Education Officer sent a notice to the school management.

References 

Private schools in Gujarat